Sérgio Paulo Rouanet (23 February 1934 – 3 July 2022) was a Brazilian diplomat, philosopher, essayist, and scholar. He was the national Secretary of Culture between 1991 and 1992, and in his tenure he created the Lei de Incentivo à Cultura (Culture Incentive Law),  a tax credit law for companies and citizens that sponsor cultural activities, which became known as Rouanet Law.

Rouanet was a member of the Brazilian Academy of Letters since 1992 to his death.

Early life and career 
Born in Rio de Janeiro, he graduated in social sciences at the Pontifical Catholic University of Rio de Janeiro. He got a master's degree in political science from Georgetown University, in economics from George Washington University, philosophy from the New York School for Social Research and also a doctorate from the University of São Paulo.

Rouanet was a general consul of Brazil in Zurich from 1976 to 1982 and Brazilian ambassador in Denmark from 1987 to 1991, when he was appointed by then president Fernando Collor de Mello to occupy the national Secretary of Culture. After Collor de Mello's impeachment, in 1992, Rouanet resigned and was appointed general consul of Brazil in Berlin from 1993 to 1995 and ambassador in Czech Republic from 1995 to 2000.

Death
Rouanet died from Parkinson's disease on 3 July 2022, in Rio de Janeiro.

Books 
 O homem é o discurso Arqueologia de Michel Foucault, with José Guilherme Merquior (1971);
 Imaginário e dominação (1978);
 Habermas, with Bárbara Freitag (1980)
 Édipo e o anjo. Itinerários freudianos em Walter Benjamin (1981)
 Teoria crítica e psicanálise (1983)
 A razão cativa. As ilusões da consciência: de Platão a Freud (1985)
 As razões do Iluminismo (1987)
 O espectador noturno. A Revolução Francesa através de Rétif de la Bretonne (1988)
 A coruja e o sambódromo (1988)
 A latinidade como parado (1999)
 A razão nômade: Walter Benjamin e outros viajantes (1994)
 Mal-estar na modernidade (2001)
 Os dez amigos de Freud  (2003)
 Idéias: da cultura global à universal (2003)
 Riso e Melancolia (2007)
 Criação no Brasil de uma Escola Superior de Administração Pública (1982)
 Rouanet 80 anos (2016).

References 

|-

1934 births
2022 deaths
Brazilian diplomats
Brazilian philosophers
Brazilian essayists
Brazilian political scientists
Ministers of Culture of Brazil
Members of the Brazilian Academy of Letters
People from Rio de Janeiro (city)
Pontifical Catholic University of Rio de Janeiro alumni
George Washington University alumni
Recipients of the Order of Cultural Merit (Brazil)
Ambassadors of Brazil to Denmark
Ambassadors of Brazil to the Czech Republic
Deaths from Parkinson's disease
Brazilian people of French descent